The National Library of Togo (Bibliothèque nationale du Togo) is the national library of Togo and is located in the capital, Lomé.

See also 
 National Archives of Togo
 List of national libraries

References

Bibliography
 
  
 . (Includes information about the national library)

Togo
Buildings and structures in Lomé
Libraries in Togo